Mardy can refer to:

As a place name
Mardy, Monmouthshire, Wales
Mardy, Shropshire, England

People
Mardy Collins, American professional basketball player
Mardy Fish, American professional tennis player

In music
"Mardy Bum", a song by British indie band Arctic Monkeys, from their debut album Whatever People Say I Am, That's What I'm Not

See also 
 Marty (disambiguation)